Vladimir Restoin Roitfeld (born 18 December, 1984) is a French-American businessman and President of CR Fashion Book
Ltd., the media company that publishes the namesake biannual style magazine founded by his
mother, Carine Roitfeld. He leads business strategy, business development, partnerships, and
extensions of the CR Fashion Book brand across publishing, licensing, and consulting, including
an international partnership with Hearst Communications Inc.
Under his leadership, CRFB has revitalized its companion men's publication, CR MEN,
launched its first international edition, CR Fashion Book Japan, and produced special projects,
including an annual calendar CR Women. Roitfeld is also President of CR Studio, a creative and
production agency that he launched with clients ranging from Christian Dior and Chanel to
Yeezy and Philipp Plein.

Early life
Roitfeld was born in Paris, France. He is the son of Christian Restoin and Carine Roitfeld, French journalist, fashion stylist, and the former editor-in-chief of French Vogue. He has an older sister, Julia Restoin Roitfeld. Roitfeld's godfather is photographer Mario Testino.

Education
Roitfeld moved to New York City at age 17 to study at NYU before graduating from the University of Southern California School of International Relations and Cinematic Arts in 2007. Subsequently, he worked as an assistant producer for Paramount Pictures, before making the transition into the art world.

Career
Prior to CRFB, Restoin Roitfeld served as the founder and director of Feedback Ltd., a
Manhattan-based private art dealership that staged exhibitions with artists such as Andy
Warhol, Peter Lindbergh, Tom Wesselmann, and Richard Hambleton. He is a graduate of the
University of Southern California, where he earned degrees in Business, International Relations,
and Cinema & Television.

Roitfeld was inspired by "pop-up" galleries, in which museum-style exhibitions have been installed in industrial spaces in New York, London, Paris, and Milan. He has worked on exhibitions with the Moscow Museum of Modern Art, Sotheby's S2 Gallery and Phillips de Pury. In 2012 Roitfeld created a private art dealership headquartered in New York.

At the 17th annual Cinema Against Aids amfAR gala in Cannes in 2010, Roitfeld collaborated with amfAr-supporter Giorgio Armani on contributing to the organization's auction tent, which included an exhibition of works by Richard Hambleton. Roitfeld and Andy Valmorbida curated the collection and donated two rare pieces to the event. Auctioneer Simon de Pury moderated the bidding and the lots brought a combined total of $920,000. Restoin Roitfiled is interviewed on screen in the 2017 documentary on Hambleton, Shadowman.

References

Living people
1982 births
French people of Russian descent
French people of Jewish descent